The building at 218 Spring Street is a Bungalow/Craftsman-style apartment house located in Kingman, Arizona. It is listed on the National Register of Historic Places. It was evaluated for National Register listing as part of a 1985 study of 63 historic resources in Kingman that led to this and many others being listed.

Description 
218 Spring Street in Kingman, Arizona was built around 1917 in the Bungalow/Craftsman style, during the 1910s growth period. The building is a multi-residential or apartment house and is an investment or rental property. The major owner is unknown. The building was added to the National Register of Historic Places in 1986.

References

Residential buildings completed in 1917
Apartment buildings in Arizona
Residential buildings on the National Register of Historic Places in Arizona
Buildings and structures in Kingman, Arizona
National Register of Historic Places in Kingman, Arizona